Alessandro Nunes Nascimento or simply Alessandro (born 2 March 1982 in São João da Boa Vista) is a Brazilian striker who currently plays for Bahia.

He became the Campeonato Brasileiro Série B 2007's top scorer with 25 goals.

Club career 
Alessandro was signed by Tombense in February 2005 on a 4-year contract. He signed another a 3-year in January 2008.

It is being reported that Ecuadorian Giants Barcelona Sporting Club have scouted Alessandro Nunes Nascimento and are going to ask Atlético Mineiro for a loan for the 2010 season.

On 8 January 2011, Alessandro has agreed to contract with Série B club Sport Recife in Brazil but in a month, he rescinded his contract and rejoined his previous club Ipatinga.

On 16 May 2011, Alessandro signed a contract with Série A side América Mineiro for the third spell. América announced he would stay at the club until 25 December 2012.

Honors

Individual Honors 
 Campeonato Brasileiro Série B Top Scorer: 2007

References

External links 
 CBF Site
 

 Net Vasco

1982 births
Living people
Albirex Niigata players
América Futebol Clube (MG) players
Brazilian footballers
Brazilian expatriate footballers
CR Vasco da Gama players
CR Flamengo footballers
Esporte Clube Juventude players
Fluminense FC players
Ipatinga Futebol Clube players
Cruzeiro Esporte Clube players
Clube Atlético Mineiro players
Sport Club do Recife players
Esporte Clube Bahia players
Feyenoord players
Lierse S.K. players
Expatriate footballers in the Netherlands
Expatriate footballers in Belgium
Expatriate footballers in Japan
Campeonato Brasileiro Série A players
Campeonato Brasileiro Série B players
Belgian Pro League players
J1 League players
J2 League players
Kyoto Sanga FC players
Association football forwards
People from São João da Boa Vista